EKCO (from Eric Kirkham Cole Limited) was a British electronics company producing radio and television sets from 1924 until 1960. Expanding into plastic production for its own use, Ekco Plastics produced both radio cases and later domestic plastic products; the plastics company became Lin Pac Mouldings Ltd.

Early history

The company's founder Eric Kirkham Cole was born on 4 July 1901 at Prittlewell, Southend-on-Sea, Essex, and was educated at Southend Day Technical School, followed by a three-year apprenticeship. Cole and his future wife Muriel Bradshaw started out making radio sets in 1924.  

William Streatfield Verrells, a schoolmaster and freelance journalist from Southend-on-Sea, wrote an article in a local newspaper asking if it was possible to power a radio set from the mains electricity supply rather than batteries. Cole saw a possible business opportunity and set about building his battery eliminator, which he later demonstrated to Verrells. Suitably impressed, Verrells joined Cole in a business venture, with Cole manufacturing the battery eliminators, and Verrells marketing them. In 1926 a private company E.K. Cole Ltd was formed with Verrells as chairman and Cole as vice-chairman. With the extra funding that was raised, the company set up a new factory at Leigh-on-Sea in 1927. After further expansion E.K. Cole Ltd became a public limited company in 1930, and moved to a spacious new factory at Southend-on-Sea. The company also began to concentrate on the manufacture of mains powered radios rather than battery eliminators which were becoming obsolete. 

The company suffered a major financial setback in 1932, when a fire swept through its research and development laboratories. The blaze destroyed much of the design work for the company’s new range of receivers.

Ekco launched its first car radio at the 1934 Radiolympia exhibition. Another important development for the company was the introduction of bakelite cabinets for its radios. Initially these cabinets were made for the company in Germany by AEG, however the introduction of high import duties on the cabinets in 1931 led Ekco to establish its own bakelite moulding shop adjacent to its Southend-on-Sea works. The company employed famous architects such as Serge Chermayeff and Wells Coates to design its bakelite radio cabinets. 

In 1935 Ekco made a substantial investment in Scophony Limited, the developers of the ingenious Scophony projection television system. Although the system showed great promise, its development was halted by the Second World War, and not resumed postwar.

World War II

Before the start of the Second World War, the Government decided to disperse certain production to locations away from obvious bombing targets. This led to a shadow factory at Cowbridge House, Malmesbury, Wiltshire, being established by Ekco. This was followed by other shadow factories at Aylesbury, Woking, Preston, and Rutherglen. The wartime headquarters of Ekco was based at Aston Clinton House in Buckinghamshire. Following the outbreak of war, the Southend-on-Sea factory was evacuated apart from the bakelite moulding shop whose large moulding presses could not be moved easily. Less than a year later, the empty factory was re-equipped to make wiring looms for aircraft such as the Avro Lancaster.

Malmesbury specialised in the top-secret development and production of the new radar systems as part of the "Western Development Unit". Radar equipment produced at Malmesbury during the war included the AI Mk. IV and AI Mk. VIII air interception radars, and the ASV Mk. II air to surface vessel radar.

In addition to radar equipment, Ekco also manufactured the ubiquitous R1155 and T1154 aircraft radios at its Aylesbury shadow factory. Ekco carried out extensive development work on both units before putting them into production, significantly improving on the original Marconi design. The R1155 and T1154 were also produced by Marconi, Plessey, and EMI. The company also manufactured the Wireless Set No. 19 tank radio at Woking. It was a Pye designed set made by several other British and American companies. In 1942, Ekco began production of its Wireless Set No. 46 portable man-pack radio, and large numbers of these were made at the company's Woking and Southend-on-Sea factories.

Post war history

 
It is estimated that by 1945 EKCO had over 8,000 people working for it across various sites making mains and portable TVs, mains and portable radios, radiograms, tape recorders, car radios, electric heaters, thermovent heaters, electric blankets, plastic toilet seats, various plastic utensils, plastic bathroom fittings and 'Superbath' baby-baths. It was at one of those sites in Malmesbury, Wiltshire that in 1948 production of the 'Thermotube' tubular heaters started.

In 1947, the company introduced the Wireless Set No. 88 VHF man-pack transceiver for use by the British Army. 

Ekco bought the Dynatron business in 1954 and the Ferranti brown goods brand in 1957 (though not Ferranti's heavy industries, defence electronics or meter businesses).

Radar

During the 1950s, the company produced a number of military radar systems including the ARI 5820 ranging radar for the Hawker Hunter; the ASV Mk. 19 air to surface vessel radar for the Fairey Gannet, and the Red Steer tail warning radar for the Avro Vulcan. EKCO also supplied weather radars for a variety of civil aircraft such as the Bristol Britannia, De Havilland Comet, Vickers Vanguard, Vickers VC10 and BAC 111. The company also made the E390/564 weather radar for the Concorde. In 1970, EKCO's radar activities were subsumed into MEL, the military electronics subsidiary of Philips.

British Electronic Industries

Ekco merged with Pye in 1960 to form a new holding company, British Electronic Industries Ltd, with C.O. Stanley as Chairman and E.K. Cole as Vice-Chairman. The following year Cole resigned from the board and retired. He died on 18 November 1966 in the Bahamas due to a bathing accident, his wife Muriel having predeceased him in 1965.

British Electronic Industries was put up for sale in 1966, and in the same year Pye closed the Southend-on-Sea factory (but maintained its car radio repair workshop until 1977) as part of its restructuring plan. In 1967, Philips Electrical Industries emerged as the new owner of the Ekco/Pye business which was then split into three different companies. By the early 1970s the Ekco brand had all but disappeared.

Ekco-Ensign
In the late 1930s, Ekco began producing its own radio valves at its Southend-on-Sea works. Following the company's decision to abandon the venture, the plant was converted to a lamp factory. In 1943, Ekco acquired Ensign Lamps based in Preston. In 1950, Ekco sold 51% of its lighting subsidiary, Ekco-Ensign Electric Ltd, to Thorn Electrical Industries.

Legacy 
The main factory at Southend-on-Sea was, after being sold to the Access credit card company, demolished to make way for a housing development. The Ekco name lives on within the development, and the site still hosts the Ekco Social and Sports Club. A statue of Eric Cole was commissioned for the housing development in 2020.

Southend Museums Service is home to the world's largest collection of Ekco material including radios, television sets, electric heaters and blankets, bathroom accessories, domestic design, kitchenware, and a large archive of documents and ephemera.

An exhibition celebrating the centenary of the foundation of Eric Cole's first radio repairing business will open at Southend Central Museum on November 26th 2022, until November 2023.

References

External links
 Air Ministry equipment numbers
 http://www.secretscotland.org.uk/index.php/Secrets/EKCOFactoryRutherglen
 Southend Museum Service
 EKCO advert on house in Southampton, 2008

Electronics companies of the United Kingdom
Defunct manufacturing companies of the United Kingdom
Companies based in Essex
Malmesbury
Radar manufacturers
History of radio